Grup Munzur is a Turkish band known for their protest songwriting and some of the group members were arrested and tried for their artistic activities. Grup Munzur was founded in 1992 in İzmir. Grup Munzur has yearly performed at Munzur Doğa ve Kültür Festivali in Tunceli Province. Musicians of Grup Munzur are known of their sympathy to the maoist movement.

Discography
 Albums
 1993 - Babanın Türküsü
 1995 - Hep Birlikte
 1997 - Tutuşturun Geceleri
 2000 - Beklenen Uzak Değil
 2003 - Bahara Çağrı
 2008 - Kızıl Anka
 2010 - Haykırış
 2016 - Hava Kurşun Gibi Ağır

See also
 Bandista
 Grup Yorum

References

External links 

 Grup Munzur official website

Turkish musical groups
Culture in İzmir
Musical groups established in 1985
Folk music groups
Folk rock groups
Maoism in Turkey
Political music groups
1985 establishments in Turkey